Zakarpattia Oblast local election, 2006 is a local election in Zakarpattia Oblast that took place on March 26, 2006. 90 seats were split among seven political parties and blocks, which received at least 3% popular vote.

Results
The distribution of the council's mandates was as follows:
 30 mandates for the People's Union "Our Ukraine";
 25 for the Yulia Tymoshenko Bloc;
 15 for the Party of Regions;
 7 for the Lytvyn People's Bloc;
 5 for the Party of Hungarians of Ukraine "KMKS";
 4 for the Democratic Party of Hungarians of Ukraine;
 4 for the Socialist Party of Ukraine.

Mikhail Kichkovsky (Our Ukraine) was elected Chairman in April 2006.

References

Local elections in Ukraine
2006 elections in Ukraine
History of Zakarpattia Oblast
March 2006 events in Ukraine